The Super Dish is a satellite dish that was deployed by the DISH Network in November 2003 as a means to provide more channels for their subscribers. Its elliptical reflector (The part that gives the SuperDish its "dish" shape) is 36" x 20"  more than 50% larger than the round 20" Dish 500. The Super Dish receives signals from three orbiting satellites, as opposed to a Dish 500 which only receives signals from two satellites. The Super Dish's three satellites are at 110°W, 119°W, and either 105°W or 121°W depending on customer requirements. The 105-degree orbital slot provided local channels via Ku band from SES Americom's AMC-15 satellite. The other, 121-degree orbital slot provided local channels and international packages via Ku band from EchoStar 9, which is also known as Galaxy 23/EchoStar 9 due to a joint partnership with Intelsat.

Technology
These two satellite services, and their older Fixed Service Satellite technology, were provided to add additional capacity that lets the DISH Network satisfy the Federal Communications Commission's "must-carry" requirements for local channels, and make room for HDTV channels. In addition, several dozen international services have been added to DISH Network's channel lineup. The Super Dish receives standard Direct broadcast satellite (DBS) services in circular polarization at 12.7GHz from EchoStar's existing 110°W and 119°W slots. The 105°W and 121°W slots are received in linear polarization at 11.7 GHz at a much lower power. As a result, Super Dish-compatible receivers must be able to receive circularly-polarized and linearly-polarized signals at two different frequency ranges from up to four satellites.

Services
Super Dish enabled DISH Network customers receive High-definition Television (HDTV), international, and/or local channels, all on one dish system. Local channels in most major cities were available as digital broadcasts over DISH Network using Super Dish, but HDTV has since been moved to the 61.5 and 129.

In 2007, most of the services at the 121-degree location were moved to the Anik F3 satellite at the 118.75-degree location. Existing Super Dish subscribers were retrofitted with a "repoint kit" to receive most of the same services via the Anik F3 satellite, also in the medium-power FSS band.

Business services were provided to several commercial customers, including many Wachovia Bank branches. These Wachovia branches, now owned by Wells Fargo, can still be seen with a Super Dish installed, through which they receive the "Wells Fargo TV" service.

See also
 Dish Network
 EchoStar Communications Corporation
 Intelsat
 Fixed Service Satellite
 Federal Communications Commission (FCC)

References

Radio frequency antenna types
Antennas (radio)
Dish Network